The 1929 Penn State Nittany Lions men's soccer team represented Pennsylvania State University during the 1929 season playing in the Intercollegiate Soccer League. It was the program's 19th season fielding a men's varsity soccer team. The 1929 season is William Jeffrey's fourth year at the helm.

Background 

The 1929 season was the Nittany Lions' 19th season as a varsity soccer program, and their 4th season playing in the Intercollegiate Soccer Football Association League. The team was led by fourth year head coach, William Jeffrey, who had previously served as the head coach for the semi-professional soccer team, Altoona Works.

The Nittany Lions were crowned National Champions by the Intercollegiate Soccer Football Association and won the Intercollegiate Soccer League. This was their second title win all time and second title under the tenure of William Jeffrey. The team was the only in the league to remain undefeated beating out Penn, Yale and Harvard for the title.

Seven members of the 1929 Nittany Lion squad received All-American recognitions.

Player movement

Departures

Squad

Roster

Schedule 

|-
!colspan=8 style=""| Regular season
|-

References

External links 

1929
Penn State Nittany Lions men's soccer
Intercollegiate Soccer Football Association Championship-winning seasons